Sunday Punch is a 1942 comedy film directed by David Miller and starring William Lundigan and Jean Rogers.

Plot
Boxers managed by Bassler and trained by Roscoe live in an all-male Brooklyn boardinghouse, where the arrival of the landlady's niece Judy gets their attention.

Judy gets to know Ken Burke, who quit medical school to try boxing, and Ole Jensen, the young janitor. Bassler is concerned that Ken's interest in Judy is distracting him, so he tries to find her a job as a singer.

Ole packs a "Sunday punch" that knocks out a pro. He decides to be a prizefighter to earn money to impress Judy, but no one except "Pops" Muller will agree to train him. Ken and Ole rise in the ranks, but reject a $30,000 offer to fight each other due to their friendship.

Their managers conspire to set up the bout. Judy roots for Ole to win, but only because that way Ken might give up boxing and become a doctor. Their story climaxes with the big fight.

Cast
William Lundigan as Ken Burke
Jean Rogers as Judy Galestrum
Dan Dailey as Olaf Jensen
Guy Kibbee as Pops Muller
J. Carrol Naish as Matt Bassler
Connie Gilchrist as Ma Galestrum
Sam Levene as Rosco
Leo Gorcey as Biff
"Rags" Ragland as Killer Connolly
Douglass Newland as Baby Fitzroy
Anthony Caruso as Nat Cucci

Reception
The film earned $229,000 in the US and Canada and $144,000 elsewhere during its initial theatrical run, making MGM a loss of $79,000.

References

External links

1942 films
1942 romantic comedy films
American black-and-white films
American romantic comedy films
1940s sports comedy films
American boxing films
1940s English-language films
Films directed by David Miller
Films set in Brooklyn
Metro-Goldwyn-Mayer films
1940s American films